"Bad Man (Smooth Criminal)" is a song by American rapper Polo G. It was released through Columbia Records on November 12, 2021, as the lead single and opening track from his reissued album, Hall of Fame 2.0. The song is an interpolation of American singer Michael Jackson's single, "Smooth Criminal", taken from his seventh studio album, Bad (1987). It was produced by J. White Did It and Larrance Dopson, while it was co-produced by Khaled Rohaim and Travis Sayles.

Background and promotion
In October 2021, Polo G debuted the song at Rolling Loud to an average to negative reception from fans. He confirmed the release of the song and its parent album, Hall of Fame 2.0, on November 8, 2021.

Music video
A music video premiered along with the song on November 12, 2021. He wears the same white suit that Michael Jackson wore in the video of "Smooth Criminal" to pay homage to the late singer. At the end of the video, a written statement by Polo G appears, in which it says:
To the family, friends and fans of Michael Jackson and his estate, We are truly grateful for all your support in the release of this song and music video. MJ is loved all around the world. We used this opportunity to represent this song for the future. We thank you sincerely and we hope we have contributed our small part to the everlasting memory and legend of the greatest entertainer of all time.

Charts

Weekly charts

Year-end charts

Certifications

Release history

References

2021 songs
2021 singles
Polo G songs
Songs written by Polo G
Songs written by J. White Did It
Songs written by Larrance Dopson
Songs written by Khaled Rohaim
Songs written by Michael Jackson
Columbia Records singles